Olympia is a 1984 single from Sérgio Mendes featuring lead vocals by Joe Pizzulo as a theme for the Los Angeles 1984 Summer Olympics.  It was released the same year on the album Confetti. The song is also used as the theme song for Olympia Sports Camp in Ontario, Canada, and for the World's Strongest Tag Determination League in All Japan Pro Wrestling.

1984 Summer Olympics
1984 singles
Sérgio Mendes songs
Olympic theme songs
1984 songs